The Bing Kong Tong was one of the powerful Tongs in San Francisco's Chinatown during the early 20th century. Since most, if not all, Chinatowns founded in the 19th-century United States were founded by migrants from the province of Canton (known as Guangdong today), many place names were transliterated from the Cantonese dialect. The word 堂, "tong" or "tong4", means "hall". 

Known as the Bing Kong Tong Society (or Bing Kung Association in Seattle, Washington), the organization was one of the largest in California when the Hop Sing and Suey Sing Tongs allied against the Bing Kongs, instigating one of the most violent Tong wars in the United States. As the gang war continued, the numerous murders caught the attention of the press as the often gruesome slayings were detailed. Eventually an investigation headed by Santa Rosa, California, attorney Wallace L. Ware, in cooperation with the district attorney's office, exposed the extent of the Bing Kongs' influence throughout the Chinese American populations along the west coast and southwestern United States (as far as the conviction of four members for a Tong murder in Kingman, Arizona). Weakened by the decade long war against the rival Tongs as well as state authorities, the Bing Kongs would eventually emerge as a trade union, although it is suspected by federal and local law enforcement officials to still have remaining ties to organized crime.

References

Devito, Carlo. Encyclopedia of International Organized Crime, Facts On File, Inc.: New York, 2005.

External links
 Bing Kong Tong website (in Traditional Chinese)
 History of Chinese Associations in Fresno (in Simplified Chinese)

Chinatown, San Francisco
Chinese-American culture in San Francisco
Gangs in San Francisco
Tongs (organizations)